Manggarai Regency is a regency in East Nusa Tenggara province of Indonesia, situated on the island of Flores. Established in 1958 the regency was reduced in size and population by the separation of Manggarai Barat regency in 2003 and of Manggarai Timur regency in 2007. The area of the residual Manggarai Regency is 2,096.44 km2 and its population was 292,037 at the 2010 census and 312,855 at the 2020 census; the official estimate as at mid 2021 was 315,041. The capital of the regency is the town of Ruteng.

The Liang Bua archeological site is in Manggarai regency, about 10 km to the north of Ruteng.

Administrative districts 
Manggarai Regency was one of the original regencies of East Nusa Tenggara Province, but was reduced in area and population on 25 February 2003 when some of its western districts were split off to form the West Manggarai Regency, and then again on 17 July 2007 when some eastern districts were split off to form the East Manggarai Regency. The remaining Manggarai Regency as at 2010 was divided into nine districts (kecamatan), but since 2010 three additional districts – Cibal Barat, Reok Barat and more recently Satar Mese Utara – have been created by splitting of existing districts. The districts are tabulated below with their areas and their populations at the 2010 census and the 2020 census, together with the official estimates as at mid 2021. The table also includes the locations of the district administrative centres, the number of administrative villages (rural desa and urban kelurahan) in each district, and its postal codes.

Notes: (a) including the island of Pulau Mules off the south coast of Flores Island. (b) the 2010 population of Satar Mese Utara is included with the figure for Satar Mese Barat District. (c) the 2010 population of Cibal Barat is included with the figure for Cibal District. (d) the 2010 population of Reok Barat is included with the figure for Reok District.

References 

Regencies of East Nusa Tenggara
1958 establishments in Indonesia
Flores Island (Indonesia)